The Locomotives on Highways Act 1896 removed the strict rules and UK speed limits that were included in the earlier Locomotive Acts which had greatly restricted the adoption of motorised vehicles  in the United Kingdom. It came into operation on 14 November 1896.

Background
The powerful railways lobby and those with interests in transport using horse-drawn vehicles advocated the original Locomotive Acts which imposed very low speed limits and other restrictions on the use of "locomotives" and motorcars on the UK public highways.

Motor car enthusiasts strongly urged the removal of these restrictions on motorcars. The Mayor of Tunbridge Wells, Sir David Salomons, organized the first automobile exhibition to be held on 15 October 1895 in his local agricultural society's showgrounds. On the day the ground was too soft so he led the vehicles out onto the road from the showground to the town.  "Not one of the horses so much as lifted an eye as the horseless carriages sped somewhat noisily by".

The enthusiasts included London company-promoter turned motor-industry promoter H. J. Lawson, who in July 1895 successfully floated his British Motor Syndicate Limited and in 1896 formed The Daimler Motor Company Limited to buy F. J. Simms' Syndicate.  F. J. Simms had already formed his Self Propelled Traffic Association in 1895 then followed it in 1897 with a motorist's club now known as the RAC. These enthusiasts, Henry Sturmey of publishers Iliffe & Sturmey edited it himself, also started The Autocar in November 1895 to tell of the burgeoning motor industry in France, attract the support of the public and publicize their promotion events.

The day before the flotation of The Daimler Motor Company Limited and Lawson's promoting gathering of almost 1,700 people on 15 February 1896, the Prince of Wales, later King Edward VII, was driven about the location, the Imperial Institute, by Simms' friend, Evelyn Ellis, in the Daimler-engined Panhard & Levassor which Ellis and Simms had brought in from France and used in July 1895 for Britain's first long-distance motorcar journey – Southampton to Datchet and on to Malvern without police intervention.  The Prince said "Evelyn, don't drive so fast, I am frightened!" as too were the bystanders but he was impressed and later agreed to become patron of Britain's first motor show.  "Ellis subsequently ran the car in many parts of England doing what he could to induce the authorities to take proceedings against him . . .  but the authorities did not accept his challenge"

By 1895 some drivers of early lightweight steam-powered autocars thought that these would be legally classed as a horseless carriage and would therefore be exempt from the need for a preceding pedestrian. John Henry Knight brought a test case to court in 1895. On 17 October 1895 Knight's assistant, James Pullinger, was stopped in Castle Street, Farnham, by the Superintendent of Police and a crowd had gathered by the time Knight arrived. The superintendent asked whether it was a steam engine, Knight replied that it was not and thus admitted liability. He and Pullinger were charged with using a locomotive without a licence. The case was heard at Farnham Petty Sessions in Farnham Town Hall on 31 October 1895. Knight and Pullinger were both fined half a crown 2s 6d (or possibly 5 shillings) plus 10 shillings costs (or possibly 12s 6d).

The government first debated the Locomotives On The Highway Act in 1895 but the bill lapsed when Gladstone's minority Liberal government fell that year. Following the 1895 General Election a new government, formed by the Conservative and Liberal Unionist parties, debated the proposal again and the act was passed taking effect 14 November 1896.

Clauses
This Act defined a new category of vehicle, light locomotives, which were vehicles under 3 tons unladen weight.

Subsequently
In celebration of the act being passed Lawson organised an Emancipation Run, which took place on 14 November 1896 when thirty vehicles travelled from London to Brighton. Annual commemoration of that emancipation day drive became famous and is known as the London to Brighton Veteran Car Run. The relaxation of usage restrictions eased the way for the development of the British motor industry.

Both the Locomotives on Highways Act 1896 and the Motor Car Act 1903 were repealed by the Road Traffic Act 1930.

See also
Roads Act 1920
Road Traffic Act 1934
Road speed limits in the United Kingdom

Notes

References

External links
 Locomotives Act, 1861 Pratt's Law of Highways Edition 10, Shaw & Sons (1865) p. 388

Vehicle law
Road transport in the United Kingdom
United Kingdom Acts of Parliament 1896
1896 in transport
Transport policy in the United Kingdom
Driving in the United Kingdom
Transport legislation
History of transport in the United Kingdom